Apsilinae is a subfamily of marine ray-finned fishes, one of four subfamilies classified within the family Lutjanidae, the snappers.

Genera
The subfamily Apsilinae contains four genera and 13 species:

 Apsilus Valenciennes, 1230
 Lipocheilus Anderson, Talwar & Johnson, 1977
 Paracaesio Bleeker, 1775
 Parapristipomoides Kami, 1963

References

Lutjanidae
Ray-finned fish subfamilies